DCW may refer to : 

 Digital Chart of the World, a comprehensive digital map of Earth
 David Cronenberg's Wife, a London-based band
 Delhi Commission for Women
 WDCW, a Washington, DC, television station branded as DCW Television
 Dorchester West railway station, station code
 DCW Software, a German software company founded by Claus Wellenreuther, later acquired by SAP
 Dhrangadhra Chemical Works, an Indian company founded by Shreyans Prasad Jain, now known as DCW